The Abatan River is a river in western Bohol, Philippines. The river winds through the towns of Catigbian, Antequera, Balilihan, and Maribojoc to its mouth at Cortes.

Its name comes from the word abad which means to meet or to converge.

At its mouth, the river opens up to an estuary, which consists of a mixed mangrove and nipa swamp.

Historically prior to road construction, the river served as a waterway for the people going to and from the interior towns. Following the success of the Loboc River tours, there are river cruises from the Abatan River Visitor Center in Cortes to various communities upstream. Kayak exploration and stand-up paddle boarding are also available. The visitor center suffered severe damage from the 2013 Bohol earthquake.

During World War II, a ship in the United States Navy was commissioned: USS Abatan (AW-4), a Pasig-class distilling ship, was named after the river.

Flora and fauna
The river basin is home to 273 plant species and 67 species of wild animals, as well as 8 species of fireflies, including Pteroptyx macdermotti which is very rare and endemic to the Philippines. The mangrove species Camptostemon philippinense (locally known as Gapas-gapas) is globally endangered and the rarest mangrove species in the Philippines.

The Abatan River estuary is home to the following true mangrove species (with local names in parentheses):

Animal varieties include mudskippers, rats, fruit bats like the Large flying fox (Pteropus vampyrus), lizards like the mangrove skink (Emoia atrocostata) and water monitor (Varanus salvator), as well as ants, spiders and fiddler crabs. Snake species include the King cobra (Ophiophagus hannah), which is locally known as Banakon, Samar cobra (Naja  samarensis), locally known as Ugahipon, and the Philippine whipsnake, locally known as Hanlulukay (Dryophiops philippina). A new species of shipworm (Lithoredo abatanicus) was identified in the river in June 2019, locally known as Antingaw.

See also
Other significant rivers in Bohol:
Inabanga River
Loboc River

References

Rivers of the Philippines
Landforms of Bohol